Zimerman is a steel looping roller coaster currently operating at Gloria's Fantasyland in Dapitan City, Philippines. The ride, manufactured by Arrow Dynamics, first opened as Revolution at Libertyland in Memphis, Tennessee in 1979. After the 2005 season, the ride was relocated to DelGrosso's Amusement Park, where it sat unused until 2013 until it was moved to Gloria's Fantasyland where it was built for the 2014 season. The ride was officially announced on December 30, 2011 as Corkscrew Coaster along with Sling Shot, a drop tower originally located at Gillian's Wonderland Pier that was later renamed to Sky Drop.

Ride experience 
Riders would exit the station and would turn right before entering the lift hill. After a small dip downward, the coaster goes into a small banked turn right before finally going down the first drop. The first drop was followed by the ride's first inversion, the loop. Riders would then go into another banked right turn before going through the other two inversions, the double corkscrews. The ride would then make a final banked right turn before entering the brake run and leading riders back into the ride's station.

References